Marcel Cristian Abăluță (born 13 February 1971) is a Romanian former professional footballer who played as a midfielder for teams such as Steaua București, Petrolul Ploiești and Farul Constanța, among others.

Honours
Petrolul Ploiești
 Cupa României: 1994–95

References

External links
 
 

1971 births
Living people
Footballers from Bucharest
Romanian footballers
Association football midfielders
Liga I players
Liga II players
FC Steaua București players
FC Petrolul Ploiești players
FC Argeș Pitești players
FCV Farul Constanța players
FC Callatis Mangalia players
Romanian football managers
LPS HD Clinceni managers
FC Steaua București assistant managers